Queen (originally The Queen) magazine was a British society publication briefly established by Samuel Beeton in 1861. It became The Queen: The Ladies Newspaper and Court Chronicle before returning to The Queen. In 1958, the magazine was sold to Jocelyn Stevens, who dropped the prefix "The" and used it as his vehicle to represent the younger side of the British Establishment, sometimes referred to as the "Chelsea Set" under the editorial direction of Beatrix Miller. In 1964, the magazine gave birth to Radio Caroline, the first daytime commercial pirate radio station serving London, England. Stevens sold Queen in 1968. From 1970, the new publication became known as Harper's & Queen after a merger of two publications: Queen and Harper's Bazaar UK, until the name Queen was dropped altogether from the masthead. It is now known as Harper's Bazaar.

History 
The Queen or The Queen: The Ladies Newspaper and Court Chronicle focused on aristocratic women in society beginning in 1862. In the late 1950s, under the editorship of Beatrix Miller, it was restyled to serve a younger readership that was defined by Miller in a style-sheet. According to Clement Freud, who wrote for the magazine, Beatrix Miller's targeted reader had long hair, was named "Caroline", had left school at age 16, was not an intellectual, but she was the sort of person that one ended up in bed with. 

When London became the focus of the Swinging 60s Jocelyn Stevens embraced designers including Mary Quant and embarked upon a project to reverse the U.K. Pilkington Report that denied any demand for commercial radio in Britain. Stevens helped to finance a pirate radio ship project that was also named Caroline with the initial intention of extending the targeted reader as the targeted listener. When Radio Caroline first went on the air (from a ship that was also renamed Caroline), it operated from the editorial offices of Queen.

The Beatrix Miller style sheet for Caroline was given to contributing writers to the magazine because it gave authors an idea of whom they were writing for. Miller left the magazine to edit Vogue shortly after Radio Caroline began broadcasting. The magazine retired the Caroline style sheet under the direction of its new editor Jocelyn Stevens himself. When the radio station moved from the Queen magazine offices, a new explanation of how and why the name "Caroline" came to be used by the station was offered to the public in order to divert attention away from its original source. Queen was celebrated in this period for its society column, "Jennifer's Diary" (written by Betty Kenward), its astrologer, "Celeste", a variety of edgy writers and elaborate fashion photography, in particular David Bailey’s pictures of Twiggy. Elizabeth Smart, author of the prose-poetry classic, "By Grand Central Station I Sat Down & Wept" was Queens books editor and columnist and wrote all the fashion copy for two years in the 1960s.

The history of the magazine and the history of the pirate radio station under the influence of Jocelyn Stevens more or less conclude with the passage of the Marine Broadcasting Offences Act in August 1967. In that year, Stevens decided to sell his to Michael Lewis of Oxley Industries, at the same time appointing Hugh Johnson as editor. The magazine changed from fortnightly to monthly publication and nearly doubled its circulation. By 1969 however, Oxley Industries had problems. Johnson resigned to write The World Atlas of Wine and Lewis sold Queen to Harper's Bazaar, who merged the titles, continuing to print it on Oxley presses.

See also 
List of women's magazines

References 
The Economist 2 May, 1964. Commercial Radio: Dial 199 for Caroline. "... Mr. Joceyln Stevens built up a successful image in his previous venture (Queen magazine) round a mythical girl of the same name but higher-class associations." (p.508)
Grenada Television (UK), 12 May, 1964. The World in Action. Interview with Jocelyn Stevens and Ronan O'Rahilly at the offices of Queen magazine which initially served as the management and sales offices for Radio Caroline.
Independent, The, 14 September, 2006. Quentin Crewe obituary. Quotes Crewe regarding the invention of the name 'Caroline' by Beatrix Miller in Queen magazine.
No Time to Die by Tiberis, Liz. Avon, New York, 1998. A profile of editor Beatrix Miller and her penchant for naming things. (pp.76-78) 'Caroline' was introduced by Miller as the name of her style sheet to provide writers with a profile of The Queen magazines readership.
Time, February 1962. - Jocelyn Stevens and his use of a 'Caroline' theme in his magazine originally called 'The Queen'.
The Queen (Christmas edition 1961), p2. Subscription invitation to readers "for Caroline". The magazine's use of this name predates its radio use by several years. Jocelyn Stevens noted that he dropped the magazine prefix on 30 January 1962 (Coleridge, Nicholas and Stephen Quinn: The Sixties in Queen. Ebury Press, London, 1987,(p.6)

External links 
 
 
History of Harpers & Queen

Fashion magazines published in the United Kingdom
Hearst Communications publications
Monthly magazines published in the United Kingdom
Magazines established in 1861
1861 establishments in the United Kingdom